Maru Pradesh is a geographical region and a proposed desert state in northwest India. Its proposed capital is Deshnoke. It would be carved out from the state of Rajasthan. The proposed state consists of Barmer, Jaisalmer, Bikaner, Churu, Ganganagar, Hanumangarh district, Jhunjhunu districts, Jodhpur district, Nagaur district, Pali district, Jalore district, Sirohi district, Sikar districts.

History 

When Rajasthan was being formed, Jodhpur and Bikaner States strongly opposed the merger of Rajasthan, and both states favoured creating a desert state. It is said that the then ruler of Jodhpur, Hanwant Singh, went to the first Lok Sabha wearing a black turban in protest against the merger into Rajasthan.

Following this, in 1953, Pratap Singh, the former Minister of Bikaner State, protested against the merger of Rajasthan and Bikaner not being constituted as a desert state. He named the protest Bikaner Bandh.

In 1956, when new states were formed, many memoranda were also given, and the government ignored the international border, citing security. From time to time, voices in different parts arose for Maru Pradesh.

Former MP Swami Keshavanand not only voiced his opinion but also wrote in his book, Marubhoomi Seva, that the entire development of this desert will happen only when this desert becomes a separate state.

In the immediate period, Gumanmal Lodha started this movement in Jodhpur and became an MP from Pali District.

In 1998, Former Maharaja Gajsingh of Jodhpur said that this desert would be developed by becoming a desert state.

Amrit Nahata, MP from Barmer, the author Dilsukh Rai Chaudhary Sikar, Chandra Prakash Deora of Jodhpur, former foreign minister Jaswant Singh, and others also voiced protests.

When Prime Minister Atal Bihari Vajpayee created three new states in the year 2000, Bhairon Singh Shekhawat wrote a letter saying that for the development of the entire Rajasthan and the internal security of the country, two parts of the state were go done.

In 2014 Sona Ram, a former MP from Barmer also raised the demand for the development of the desert. Similarly, Congress leader Rameshwar Lal Dudi, Bhadra former MLA Suresh Chaudhary, MP and RLP leader Hanuman Beniwal have also expressed support for Maru Pradesh.

Demographics
Per the Census 2011 data, the total population of the proposed state is 28,132,949.

References

Further reading

External links 
Jodhpur?t=KLj2Hn0zjoG6raziyhgZ1Q&s=09 Maru Pradesh

Proposed states and union territories of India